Fulgence Ouedraogo (born 21 July 1986) is a former French rugby union player. He played the entirety of his 17 year career for Montpellier Hérault RC in the Top 14 championship. His usual position was as a flanker.

Ouedraogo started playing rugby at the age of six, meeting future teammate François Trinh-Duc at the Pic-Saint-Loup rugby school near Montpellier. They both entered the club's youth teams at "Cadet" level (U-13/14). The two are said to be inseparable friends.

Ouedraogo and Trinh-Duc, together with fellow Montpellierains Louis Picamoles and Julien Tomas, are considered part of the young quartet of home-grown talents embodying the success of Montpellier's attempt at "shaking up the old order" of French rugby in the Septimanie terroir which had always been historical rival Béziers's stronghold.

Ouedraogo is the current captain of Montpellier, and was a key player in the club's outstanding 2010–11 season. He fractured his hand in the 26–25 semi-final win, causing him to miss the final, which was won by Toulouse.

International career

France's coach Bernard Laporte acknowledged Ouedraogo's outstanding club form by including him in France's mid-year Test squad for a two-game series against the All Blacks in New Zealand in 2007. Ouedraogo made his international debut as a replacement in the second test in Wellington, but ended up not making the cut for the 2007 Rugby World Cup squad. He was later called up by new coach Marc Lièvremont for the 2008 Six Nations Championship.

Ouedraogo was named in France's squad for the 2011 Rugby World Cup. He was an unused replacement as New Zealand beat France in the final.

Ouedraogo was selected by new coach Philippe Saint-André in the initial 30-man squad for the 2012 Six Nations Championship, but was not chosen for the first two matches. He was later selected for France's 2012 Autumn Internationals, and was in the starting line-up for all three test matches.

International tries

Personal
Ouedraogo is a cousin of the famous MMA fighter and long-time UFC veteran Cheick Kongo. He has the initials of his sister, mother and brother (MBG) tattooed on his left shoulder in hindi.

References

External links
 
 
 RBS 6 Nations profile
 Profile at L'Equipe.fr
 

1986 births
French rugby union players
Burkinabé emigrants to France
Sportspeople from Ouagadougou
Living people
Rugby union flankers
Montpellier Hérault Rugby players
France international rugby union players
21st-century Burkinabé people